Pseudonocardia oroxyli is a soil-dwelling actinomycete that was isolated from the roots of the South-East Asia tree Oroxylum indicum.

References

External links
Type strain of Pseudonocardia oroxyli at BacDive -  the Bacterial Diversity Metadatabase

Pseudonocardia
Bacteria described in 2006